Kataoka (written: 片岡) is a Japanese surname. Notable people with the surname include:

Azusa Kataoka (born 1988), Japanese voice actress and singer
Chiezō Kataoka (1903–1983), Japanese actor
, Japanese golfer
Drue Kataoka, Japanese American visual artist
Hiroji Kataoka (born 1941), Japanese academic
Kataoka Ainosuke VI (born 1972), Japanese actor and kabuki actor
Kataoka Nizaemon XII (1882–1946), Japanese kabuki actor
Kataoka Shichirō (1854–1920), Imperial Japanese Navy officer
Koji Kataoka (born 1977), Japanese footballer
, Japanese politician
Reiko Kataoka (born 1971), Japanese actress
Satoshi Kataoka (born 1958), Japanese Go player
Shinwa Kataoka (born 1985), Japanese actor
Shuji Kataoka (born 1950), Japanese film director and screenwriter
Tadasu Kataoka (1915–1963), Imperial Japanese Army officer
Kataoka Tamako, (1905–2008), Japanese Nihonga painter
Tsurutarō Kataoka (born 1954), Japanese actor
Yasushi Kataoka (1876–1946), Japanese architect
Yasuyuki Kataoka (born 1983), Japanese baseball player
Yoshirō Kataoka (born 1945), Japanese anime producer
Yōsuke Kataoka (born 1982), Japanese footballer

Fictional characters
, a character in the Assassination Classroom anime and manga

See also
Kataoka Station, a railway station in Tochigi Prefecture, Japan
10301 Kataoka, a main-belt asteroid

Japanese-language surnames